Robert Anthony Fisher  is a New Zealand barrister and former chairman and partner of the law firm Simpson Grierson. He was legal counsel at the Auckland Transition Agency, the body responsible for the reorganization of local government in the Auckland region. He specializes in resource management law. Rob is recommended as a leading lawyer in his field in the International Who's Who of Environmental Lawyers 2009, International Who's Who of Business Lawyers 2009  and in the Guide to the World's Leading Environment Lawyers 2009. Fisher was the 2010 Barrister of the Year in the New Zealand Law Awards, and was appointed an Officer of the New Zealand Order of Merit, for services to sport, in the 2011 Queen’s Birthday Honours.

Fisher is a member of several boards and organizations:
 Board of Genesis Energy
 Board of Sport and Recreation New Zealand (SPARC) 
 Eden Park Trust
 Institute of Directors in New Zealand
 Resource Management Law Association
 New Zealand Business Roundtable

He had a long career in rugby administration, both nationally and internationally, including as Chairman of Auckland Rugby Union, New Zealand Rugby Union and vice-chairman of the International Rugby Board and a board member of Rugby World Cup Limited.

References

Living people
20th-century New Zealand lawyers
Officers of the New Zealand Order of Merit
Year of birth missing (living people)
New Zealand sports executives and administrators
21st-century New Zealand lawyers